One of the Boys is the third studio album by American country music singer Gretchen Wilson. It was released on May 15, 2007.

Following its release, the album debuted at number five on the U.S. Billboard 200, selling about 73,000 copies in its first week.
As of May 9, 2008, the album has sold 232,000 copies in the US. The album produced three chart singles for Wilson on the Billboard Hot Country Songs charts: "Come to Bed" (a duet with John Rich of Big & Rich), followed by the title track and "You Don't Have to Go Home", the first single of Wilson's career to miss Top 40 on the country charts.

Track listing

The bonus track "Wasting Whiskey" later became available on Amazon MP3 after Circuit City went out of business.

Personnel
 Pat Buchanan - electric guitar
 Tom Bukovac - acoustic guitar, electric guitar
 J.T. Corenflos - electric guitar
 Eric Darken - percussion
 Shannon Forrest - drums, percussion
 Brandon Fraley - background vocals
 Wes Hightower - background vocals
 Mark Hill - bass guitar
 Dan Hochhalter - fiddle
 Mike Johnson - steel guitar
 Steve Nathan - Hammond organ, piano
 Mark Oakley - electric guitar
 Michael Rhodes - bass guitar
 John Rich - background vocals on "Come to Bed"
 John Willis - acoustic guitar, guitjo, mandolin
 Gretchen Wilson - lead vocals, background vocals
 Jonathan Yudkin - cello, fiddle, mandolin

Chart performance

Weekly charts

Year-end charts

Singles

References

External links

2007 albums
Columbia Records albums
Gretchen Wilson albums
Albums produced by John Rich
Albums produced by Mark Wright (record producer)